The Low-Income Housing Tax Credit (LIHTC - often pronounced "lie-tech", Housing Credit) is a dollar-for-dollar tax credit in the United States for affordable housing investments.  It was created under the Tax Reform Act of 1986 (TRA86) and gives incentives for the utilization of private equity in the development of affordable housing aimed at low-income Americans, with affordability restrictions on the properties expiring 15-30 years later. LIHTC accounts for the majority (approximately 90%) of all newly created affordable rental housing in the United States today.  The maximum rent that can be charged for designated affordable units is based on Area Median Income (AMI), and over 50% of residents in LIHTC properties are considered Extremely Low-Income (at or below 30% AMI).   The credits are also commonly called Section 42 credits in reference to the applicable section of the Internal Revenue Code. The tax credits are more attractive than tax deductions as the credits provide a dollar-for-dollar reduction in a taxpayer's federal income tax, whereas a tax deduction only provides a reduction in taxable income.  The "passive loss rules" and similar tax changes made by TRA86 greatly reduced the value of tax credits and deductions to individual taxpayers. Less than 10% of current credit expenditures are claimed by individual investors.

In 2010, the President's Economic Recovery Advisory Board (PERAB) estimated that the LIHTC program would cost the federal government $61 billion (an average of about $6 billion per year) in lost tax revenue from participating corporations from 2008-2017, as well as noting that some experts believe that  vouchers would more cost-effectively help low income households.

A 2018 report by the GAO covering the years 2011-2015 found that the LIHTC program financed about 50,000 low-income rental units annually, with median costs per unit for new construction ranging from $126,000 in Texas to $326,000 in California.
 
 LIHTC projects increase land value in surrounding neighborhoods.

Overview
The United States Tax Reform Act of 1986 (TRA86) adversely affected many investment incentives for rental housing while leaving incentives for home ownership.  Since low-income people are more likely to live in rental housing than in owner-occupied housing, this would have decreased the new supply of housing accessible to them. The Low-Income Housing Tax Credit (LIHTC)  was  added to TRA86 to provide some balance and encourage investment in multifamily housing for those in need of affordable rental housing options. Over the subsequent 20 years, it has become an extremely effective tool for developing affordable rental housing. The LIHTC program has helped meet a critical affordable housing shortage by stimulating the production or rehabilitation of nearly 2.4 million affordable homes since 1986. Through development activity, the LIHTC creates and supports approximately 95,000 jobs annually - the majority of which are small business sector jobs.

How it works

The LIHTC provides funding for the development costs of low-income housing by allowing an investor (usually the partners of a partnership that owns the housing) to take a federal tax credit equal to a percentage (either 4% or 9%, for 10 years, depending on the credit type) of the cost incurred for development of the low-income units in a rental housing project.  Development capital is raised by "syndicating" the credit to an investor or, more commonly, a group of investors.  To take advantage of the LIHTC, a developer will either (i) propose a project to a state agency, seek and win a competitive allocation of tax credits, or (ii) obtain approval and issuance of tax-exempt bonds to finance at least 50% of project cost, and then complete the project, certify its cost, and rent-up the project to low income tenants. Simultaneously, an investor will be found that will make a capital contribution to the partnership or limited liability company that owns the project in exchange for being allocated the entity's LIHTCs over a ten-year period. The amount of the credit will be based on (i) the amount of credits awarded to the project in the competition, (ii) the actual cost of the project, (iii) the tax credit rate announced by the IRS, and (iv) the percentage of the project's units that are rented to low-income tenants.  Failure to comply with the applicable rules, or a sale of the project or an ownership interest before the end of at least a 15-year period, can lead to recapture of credits previously taken, as well as the inability to take future credits.  These rules are described in greater detail below.

The program's structure as part of the tax code ensures that private investors bear the financial burden if properties are not successful. This pay-for-performance accountability has driven private sector discipline to the LIHTC program, resulting in a foreclosure rate of less than 0.1%, far less than that of comparable market-rate properties. As a permanent part of the tax code, the LIHTC program necessitates public-private partnerships, and has leveraged more than $75 billion in private equity investment for the creation of affordable rental housing.

Application process

The first step in the process is for a project owner to submit an application to a state authority, which will consider the application competitively. The application will include estimates of the expected cost of the project and a commitment to comply with one of the following conditions, known as "set-asides":
At least 20% or more of the residential units in the development are both rent restricted and occupied by individuals whose income is 50% or less than the area median gross income ("20/50").
At least 40% or more of the residential units in the development are both rent restricted and occupied by individuals whose income is 60% or less than the area median gross income ("40/60").
At least 40% or more of the residential units in the development are both rent restricted and occupied by individuals whose income does not exceed the imputed income limitation designated by the taxpayer with respect to the respective unit. The average of the imputed income limitations shall not exceed 60% of the area median gross income ("income averaging").

Typically, the project owner will agree to a higher percentage of low income usage than these minimums, up to 100% 60$. Low-income tenants can be charged a maximum rent of 30% of the maximum eligible income, which is 60% of the area's median income adjusted for household size as determined by HUD. There are no limits on the rents that can be charged to tenants who are not low income but live in the same project.

Program administration

The program is administered at the state level by State housing finance agencies with each state getting a fixed allocation of credits based on its population. The state housing agency has wide discretion in determining which projects to award credits, and applications are considered under the state's "Qualified Allocation Plan" (QAP).  The credits are usually awarded to projects in a few "allocation rounds" held each year, on a competitive basis. Typically, the top ranked project will get credits, then the second, and so on until the credits are exhausted for the round. A portion of each state's credits must be "set aside" for projects sponsored by non-profit organizations, although non-profits more typically apply for credits under the "general" rules, without regard to the set-aside.

This allows each state to set its own priorities and address its specific housing goals. It also encourages developers to offer benefits that are better than the established minimums when competing against other projects (e.g., charging lower rents, or maintaining the low income requirements for a longer number of years, will often improve a project's rank in the competitive process; it is important to check the particular state's QAP and application to see how it makes these judgments).

Not all projects claim the low income credit based on this competitive process. Projects that are financed by tax-exempt bonds can also qualify for the credit. Certain types of tax-exempt bonds are also limited on a state-by-state basis, and the state agency responsible for bonds may be different, but the state agency generally applies similar rules as the agency responsible for the tax credit program.  The credit rate is 4% for bond-financed projects, as opposed to 4% for acquisition of existing buildings, and 9% for new construction or rehabilitation for competitively awarded credits.

Terms & Conditions

The project owner must agree to comply with Section 42 and maintain an agreed percentage of low income units in a "Land Use Restriction Agreement" (LURA) which is recorded.  Under the LURA, the project is required to meet the particular project's low income requirements for a 15-year initial "compliance period" and a subsequent 15-year "extended use period" (or longer, if required by the local authority; the extended use rules were added in 1989, and do not apply to projects developed in the first few years of the program). The credits are subject to "recapture" if the project fails to comply with the requirements of Section 42 of the Tax Code during the 15-year compliance period.  Rules that required a taxpayer to post a "bond" if a recapture event occurred were repealed in 2008.

Eligible basis

The "eligible basis" of a project is the cost of acquiring an existing building if there is one (but not the cost of the land), plus construction and other construction-related costs to complete the project. (For example, the costs of obtaining permanent financing, or "syndicating" the credits to an investor are not included. Adjustments must be made for federal grants as well.). This is then multiplied by the percentage of the units that are "low income", in accordance with the conditions described above, to determine the project's "qualified basis" that actually qualifies for the credit. For this reason, many developers agree to make 100% of the units low income in order to maximize the potential tax credits. Projects for (1) new construction and (2) the cost of rehabilitating an existing building, if not funded by tax-exempt bonds, can receive a maximum annual tax credit allocation based on a rate which is generally 4% of any acquired building's basis, and 9% of the project's eligible basis in new construction or rehabilitation.  The cost of projects financed in whole or in part with tax-exempt bonds, are eligible for a credit of approximately 3% to 4% annually, and, in most cases, fixed at 4% starting in 2021.  The credit percentages are announced monthly by the Internal Revenue Service, but for buildings placed in service after July 30, 2008, the credit for new and rehabilitated buildings that are not financed with tax-exempt bonds is not less than 9%, and for most bond-financed projects with bonds issued after 2020, a 4% rate. Rules that provided a lower credit rate for "below-market federal loans" were repealed in 2008, applicable to buildings placed in service after July 30, 2008. Another rule that does not allow a credit for the acquisition cost of existing buildings, unless they were last placed in service more than ten years ago, no longer applies if the building was substantially financed pursuant to a large number of federal or state programs.  The cost of land is not eligible for credits.

Credit limitations

Regardless of the result of these computations, the credit cannot exceed the amount allocated by the state agency.  For example, suppose a project cost $100,000 for land, $400,000 for an existing building that was most recently placed in service more than ten years ago, and $1,000,000 for rehabilitation; also suppose that the applicable percentages are 4% and 9%, that the project will be 80% low income, that there are no tax-exempt bonds, and that the state agency awarded $70,000 per year of credits. The credits are computed as follows -- (1) the cost of the land is not eligible for credits; (2) the maximum annual credit for the purchase of the building is $400,000 times 80% times 4%, or $12,800; (3) the maximum annual credit for the rehabilitation is $1,000,000 times 80% times 9%, or $72,000.  The total maximum annual credits, $84,800, is more than the amount of credits awarded by the state.  As a result, the project is limited to $70,000 of credits per year.

The credits are not provided in a lump sum but instead are claimed in equal amounts over a 10-year "credit period" (many projects claim credits over 11 years, due to the rules governing how many credits can be claimed in the first year of the credit period). Thus, the $70,000 of annual credits described in the illustration will yield a total of $700,000 of credits over the credit period.

Syndication and partnership

A tax credit, or equity, syndicator connects private investors seeking a strong return on investments with developers seeking cash for a qualified LIHTC project.  As mentioned above, the credit is used to generate private equity, often prior to, or during, the construction of the project. Developers typically "sell" the credits by entering into limited partnerships (or limited liability companies) with an investor, with 99.99% of the profits, losses, depreciation, and tax credits being allocated to the investor as a partner in the partnership. The developer serves as the general partner/managing member, and receives a majority of the cash flow (either through the payment of fees, or through distributions). The funds generated through the syndication vary from market to market and year-to-year.  Although 85-95¢ for each total dollar of tax credits was common in the first several years of the 21st century, recent turmoil in the financial markets, and reduction in tax rates has reduced some of the demand for tax breaks, meaning that investors are paying somewhat less.  So, for example, $10,000 credits annually for the next 10 years would be $100,000 total, and a developer could probably raise $80,000-$85,000 through syndication.  Further, due to the fact that depreciation on the buildings owned by the partnership is also tax deductible, and that depreciation is allocated 99.99% to the investor, investors may pay still more for the total tax benefits.  (Indeed, when the credit alone was selling for 95 cents per dollar of credit, there were some cases where investors actually paid slightly more than a dollar for a dollars worth of tax credits plus other tax benefits.)  

An investor will typically stay in the partnership for at least the compliance period, because a reduction in its interest can also result in recapture of the credits.  An investor wishing to exit the partnership before the end of the compliance period may post a surety bond to avoid credit recapture.

The following table summarizes the relationship between the developer and outside investors. NOTE: This is only meant to demonstrate the concept of partnerships for such projects and is not to be taken as literal guidelines for developing a LIHTC project.

{| class="wikitable"
! colspan="3"|LIHTC Partnership Structure
|-
!Party
!Developer
!Investor
|-
|Partner Level
|General or Managing
|Limited
|-
|Management of Project</td>YesNo
|-
|Partnership Control
|Primary
|some veto rights
|-
|Share of LIHTC
|0.01%
|99.99%
|-
|Share of Initial Equity
|0.01%
|99.99%
|}

The annual allocations under the program increased significantly in 2001 when Congress increased the state allocations by 40%.

Compliance

States are also responsible for monitoring the ongoing development costs, quality and operation of approved projects, as well as the enforcement threat of notifying the IRS of "noncompliance" if the project deviates from the applicable requirements of the Code and the LURA, described above. Such a notice can lead to recapture of previously taken credits and inability to claim credits from the project in the future. The IRS has published Form 8823 for the purpose of reporting possible problems with the project, and its Guide to the Form 8823 that details the IRS view on various issues related to noncompliance.

Owners of LIHTC properties and their management agents must be able to prove the tenants living in the low income units meet the eligibility requirements of the LIHTC Program and remain eligible throughout their tenancy. [Section 1.42-5(b)][1] The initial eligibility requirements include, but are not limited to, income eligibility, rent restriction, full-time student limitations, and non-exclusion of Section 8 applicants. Also, each year the tenant remains in the low-income unit, a re-examination or recertification must be performed to ensure the tenant continues to remain LIHTC Program eligible. Failure to correctly prove initial eligibility and re-examine continued eligibility is noncompliance and puts the LIHTC owner at risk of losing its credit claim.

Thorough documentation of tenants' eligibility is required and records must be maintained for each qualified tenant. Records from the first year of participation in the LIHTC Program must be maintained for 21 years from the date the tax return claiming these credits was filed including all extensions, and subsequent years' records must be maintained for 6 years from the date the tax return claiming the applicable credits was filed including all extensions. [Section 1.42-5(b)(vii)(2)][2]

Owners must report on the compliance status of the LIHTC property at least annually to the State Allocation Agency from which it received its credit allocation. [Section 1.42-5(c)][3] At least annually, State Allocation Agencies are required to monitor and inspect the LIHTC properties in which it has allocated credits. Any discovered or suspected noncompliance must be reported to the Internal Revenue Service (IRS) using IRS Form 8823. State Allocation Agencies must follow very specific requirements for monitoring, inspecting and reporting as laid out by the IRS. [Section 1.42-5 and Federal Register: January 14, 2000 (Volume 65, Number 10) – Compliance Monitoring and Miscellaneous Issues Relating to the Low-Income Housing Credit] [4]

Owners and their management agents are strongly encouraged and in some cases mandated by their State Allocation Agencies to become certified compliance professionals. Certifications can be obtained by several LIHTC industry groups. Certifications include the National Compliance Professional (NCP), the Site Compliance Specialist (SCS), the Housing Credit Certified Professional (HCCP), the Specialist in Housing Credit Management (SHCM), and the Certified Credit Compliance Professional (C3P). Certifications requirements usually include an Education and Experience Requirement. The Education Requirement is met by successfully passing an industry exam and accruing the applicable number of required course hours. The Experience Requirements vary among designations. All designations also contain a continuing education component to ensure certified professionals maintain their knowledge and keep abreast of the LIHTC Program changes.

2008 Financial Crisis Impact on LIHTC

Under law, the only investors eligible for Low-Income Housing Tax Credit (LIHTC) investments are large C corporations.  As the financial markets deteriorated in the second half of 2008, so did the C corporations’ profits that are typically offset by tax credits, like the LIHTC.  As a result, the market for LIHTCs was decimated.  The development of new tax credit properties and rehabilitation activities for older affordable housing properties froze completely.

Congress took action in February 2009 to help restart the LIHTC market.  The American Recovery and Reinvestment Act of 2009 created two gap-financing programs to help tax credit properties, which were ready to begin construction, get additional financing.

First, Title XII of the Recovery Act appropriated $2.25 billion to the HOME Investment Partnerships (HOME) Program—administered by the U.S. Department of Housing and Urban Development (HUD)—for a grant program to provide funds for capital investments in LIHTC projects.  HUD awarded Tax Credit Assistance Program (TCAP) grants to state housing credit agencies to facilitate development of projects that received LIHTC awards between October 1, 2006, and September 30, 2009.  The State housing agencies were allowed to offer the assistance in either a grant or loan form to the properties.

Second, Section 1602 of the Recovery Act allowed State housing agencies to elect to receive cash grants instead of the tax credits for up to 40% of the State’s LIHTC allocation.  The Department of Treasury estimated outlay to States was $3 billion for 2009.  State housing agencies were required to use a grant to make sub-awards to finance the acquisition or construction of qualified low-income buildings, generally subject to the LIHTC requirements discussed (including rent, income, and use restrictions on such buildings).  The Section 1602 program was applicable to LIHTC awards made between October 1, 2006, and September 30, 2009.  Recent Congressional legislation proposed expanding this program to 2010 housing credits (see below).

In the latter part of 2010, the market stabilized as non-traditional investors began to back fill the investment gap. LIHTC advocates rallied around legislative proposals to ensure that investment remained stable in both the short-term and in the future. Harvard University's Joint Center for Housing Studies and the Massachusetts Institute of Technology's Center for Real Estate have identified potential opportunities on which to improve the LIHTC to make it more efficient.

Legislation Impacting LIHTC

The 2018 Omnibus Spending Bill

The passage of the Consolidated Appropriations Act of 2018 (H.R.1625) increased the LIHTC state allocation by 12.5% beginning in 2018 and lasting until 2021. This increase was not extended beyond the fiscal year 2021.

The Affordable Housing Credit Improvement Act (AHCIA)

First introduced in 2016 by Senator Maria Cantwell (D-WA), Orrin Hatch (R-UT), and Chuck Schumer (D-NY), the AHCIA contains provisions to modify the Low-Income Housing Tax Credit. Among the provisions are an increase in the LIHTC state allocation and credit bonuses for developments serving veterans, rural areas, native communities, and extremely low-income individuals.   The AHCIA has been reintroduced in each subsequent Congress in both the Senate and House. 

Since its original introduction, three key provisions of the AHCIA have been enacted: a minimum 4 percent Housing Credit rate in 2020, a 12.5 percent allocation increase in 2018 (which expired in 2021), and “income averaging,” which allows properties to serve tenants with a broader range of incomes, in 2018.

Evaluations and Studies
In 2010, the President's Economic Recovery Advisory Board (PERAB) estimated that the LIHTC program would cost the federal government $61 billion (an average of about $6 billion per year) in lost tax revenue from participating corporations from 2008-2017, as well as noting that experts believe that  vouchers would more cost-effectively help low income households.

A 2018 report by the GAO covering the years 2011-2015 found that the LIHTC program financed about 50,000 low-income rental units annually, with median costs per unit for new construction ranging from $126,000 in Texas to $326,000 in California.
 

Some other notable findings were that:
the range of per-unit costs varied dramatically, with Georgia having the lowest variance ($104,000) between the least expensive per-unit cost and the most expensive per-unit cost, while California had the highest variance of $606,000. (Meaning that the per-unit cost in California varied from about $140,000 to about $750,000.)
larger projects (>100 units) were about $85,000 less expensive per-unit than smaller (<37 units) projects
urban projects cost about $13,000 more per-unit than non-urban projects
projects for senior tenants (about a third of all projects) cost about $7,000 less per unit (possibly because of smaller unit sizes

See also

United States Department of Housing and Urban Development
United States Department of Treasury
Internal Revenue Service
Internal Revenue Code
:Category:Housing finance agencies of the United States 
Tax Reform Act of 1986
HUD USER
Regulatory Barriers Clearinghouse

External links
Office of Housing and Urban Development
List of State Housing Finance Agencies
HUD USER LIHTC Database
National Council of State Housing Agencies
LIHTC Tax Code
Novogradac & Co. LIHTC Database
 National Equity Fund LIHTC

Notes

Affordable housing
Taxation in the United States
Tax credits
Housing in the United States